Two Weeks Off is a 1929 American silent comedy film directed by William Beaudine. The film was released in alternative silent and sound versions.  It is currently a lost film.

Cast
 Dorothy Mackaill as Kitty Weaver
 Jack Mulhall as Dave Pickett
 Gertrude Astor as Agnes
 James Finlayson as Pa Weaver
 Kate Price as Ma Weaver
 Jed Prouty as Harry
 Eddie Gribbon as Sid Winters
 Gertrude Messinger as Tessie McCann

References

External links
 

1929 films
1929 comedy films
1929 lost films
Silent American comedy films
American silent feature films
American black-and-white films
Films directed by William Beaudine
Lost American films
Lost comedy films
Films with screenplays by Joseph F. Poland
1920s American films